Springfield Public Schools (SPS), also known as the Springfield R-12 School District, is a public school district headquartered in Springfield, Missouri, United States. With an official fall 2020 enrollment of 24,309 students attending 35 elementary schools, one intermediate schools, nine middle schools and five high schools, it is the largest public school district in the state of Missouri. Public high schools located in Springfield include Central High School, Kickapoo High School, Hillcrest High School, Parkview High School, and Glendale High School.

History
It was established in 1868. In 2018, as part of a plan to sell a bond issue to parents, the district hired architects to develop plans for new schools to show to parents. In 2018, twelve of the district's schools had "secure vestibules" controlling entry, and the district was making efforts to establish more.

Accomplishments
SPS 4-year graduation rate for 2020 was 93.6 %.
SPS has the state's only K-12 International Baccalaureate program.
The Springfield community has recently invested more than $168 million to improve its education facilities. 
They average teaching experience of their teachers about 12.1 years, and more than 62.9% of teachers have advanced degrees.

Schools

Demographics 
The school district has seen a rise in the number of non white students in the past twenty years, in 2000 white enrollment was 90.8%, since that time it has dropped to 75.3%, the number of black and Asian students has doubled, and Latino students have more than tripled.

Superintendent

References

External links
 Springfield Public Schools
 
School districts in Missouri
Education in Springfield, Missouri
1868 establishments in Missouri
Educational institutions established in 1868